Hemant Bhagwani is an Indo-Canadian chef, sommelier, restaurateur, cookbook author, and entrepreneur based in Toronto, Ontario, Canada.

Early years 
Hemant Bhagwani was born in New Delhi, India.

Education
Bhagwani acquired his hotel and culinary management degree from Alpina School of Hotel Management Parpan in Switzerland (1993) and followed it up with an EMBA from the University of Sydney (1994). He completed his professional sommelier certification in Toronto, Canada, in 2002.

Career
Bhagwani started his career by operating food service establishments in Sydney, Australia from 1994 to 1996, and then in Dubai, U. A. E. from 1996 to 2000.  In 2000, Bhagwani arrived in Toronto, and within two weeks, started working in CN Tower as Manager, Food and Beverage.

In 2002, he decided to venture out on his own and took over a Hakka Chinese restaurant in Brampton, Ontario. He turned it around and renamed it. He followed it up with Kamasutra restaurant and wine bar in Midtown, Toronto, Canada, in 2003.

In 2007, he opened Amaya the Indian Room on Bayview Avenue, Toronto, and Amaya's Bread Bar in 2008 in midtown Toronto. He expanded the Amaya brand under the name of Amaya Express across Ontario, Canada.

In 2013, Bhagwani created a unique Indian cuisine concept – Marathi, that continues to operate at Terminal 1, Toronto Pearson International Airport.

Bhagwani started a lively Indian restaurant by the name Indian Street Food Co. in 2015. He was the first restaurateur in Toronto to institute the policy of no tipping to create an equal work environment. In the summer of the same year, Bhagwani conceptualized and opened Sindi Street Food in Mississauga. Thus, being a serial entrepreneur, he was recognized as a finalist in the 2015 Ernst & Young Entrepreneur of the Year Award.

In 2016, Bhagwani opened The Fat Beet, blends of Indian, Persian and Middle Eastern cuisine restaurant in Thornhill, Ontario.

On January 25, 2017, Bhagwani opened Leela Indian Food Bar, in The Junction neighbourhood of Toronto.  In August of that year, he sold Indian Street Food Co.

In April 2018, Bhagwani launched a new club-themed restaurant, The Kolkata Club, in Mississauga, Ontario.

Bhagwani was mentioned in Forbes online for sharing his entrepreneurial experience. Bhagwani cherishes supporting young entrepreneurs in the hospitality industry.

In the winter of 2018, Bhagwani launched another fast-casual concept, namely Good Karma,  a chain specializing in Indian food made from organic and locally sourced ingredients.

Bhagwani is a strong supporter of skilled trades workers in Canada. He advocates and employs hundreds of immigrant staff in his group of companies. He was hailed in media for supporting the immigration of foreign trade workers in Canada. He encourages his staff members as his extended family.

In late 2018, Bhagwani opened an Indian regional cuisine specialty restaurant named Goa Indian Farm Kitchen in Bayview Village Shopping Centre in North York, Toronto.  In January 2020, he opened POPA – the first Burmese cuisine restaurant in Toronto at the Bayview Village Shopping Centre.

In March 2020, Bhagwani was in the process of opening an independently run Indian cuisine restaurant at Chef's Assembly Hall when the city of Toronto was put under emergency closure to curtail the spread of COVID-19. 
He is the first Canadian restaurateur to launch a lawsuit against insurance companies denying COVID-19 claims.

On July 1, 2020, Bhagwani opened a new brunch restaurant named Egg Bird, in Leaside, Toronto.

December 2022, Hemant Bhagwani is all set to bring his style of Indian cuisine to Tribeca, New York at 78 Leonard Street, the former Tetsu.

References

Living people
University of Sydney alumni
Canadian male chefs
Canadian cookbook writers
Year of birth missing (living people)
Chefs of Indian cuisine
Indian chefs
Sommeliers
Canadian restaurateurs
Canadian people of Indian descent
People from New Delhi